Moti K. Kripalani, ICS, was an Indian civil servant who went to serve as Chief commissioner of Ajmer and Pondicherry.

Chief Commissioner of Pondicherry
The state of Pondicherry comprised ex-French settlements of India after their de facto transfer in October 1954. Kripalani succeeded Kewal Singh as the chief commissioner of Pondicherry on 16 November 1956. The political musings of 1st Pondicherry Representative Assembly during tenure became a quite a sensation and it caught the attention of then Prime minister Jawaharlal Nehru and others. Some of his decisions were criticized by political leaders of Pondicherry who rued that delay in de jure transfer is one of the main reasons as the Pondicherry assembly had only advisory role and Chief commissioner can take decisions overriding the assembly.

Autobiography
He has recounted some important events in his life and civil service in his book Some Memories of Old Bengal. In that book he mentions that as a higher civil servant in those days he pursued particular hobbies and other recreational activities during his posting in Rajshahi (now in Bangladesh).

Offices held

See also 
 Ajmer State
 List of lieutenant governors of Puducherry

References

Notes

Lieutenant Governors of Puducherry
Indian civil servants
State political office-holders in India